Wurgwitz is a district of the Saxon city Freital in Sächsische Schweiz-Osterzgebirge district.

Geography

Local level 
Wurgwitz consists of three other villages:
 Niederhermsdorf
 Hammer
 Kohlsdorf

History 
Wurgwitz was first mentioned at 31 March 1206 together with Dresden, Freital-Potschappel and other villages and towns. Since then, the names of Wurgwitz, Niederhermsdorf and Kohlsdorf repeatedly changed:

Wurgwitz:

 1206: Hermannu de Worganewiz
 1303: miles Henricus de Woganewytz
 1308: Heynrich von Wrganuwicz
 1378: Worganwicz / Worgenewicz
 1445: Worgewicz
 1461: Wurgenwicz
 1648: Wurgewitz
 1791: Wurgwitz

Kohlsdorf:

 1450: Colostorff
 1469: Kolßdorff
 1470: Quolsdorff
 1485: Coelßdorff
 1514: Colßdorff
 1587: Kuelßdorf
 1616: zu Culßdorff
 1791: Kohlsdorf

Niederhermsdorf
 1350: Hermannsdorf
 1381: Nydern Hermannsdorf
 1445: Nidder Hermestorf
 1461: Hermstorff
 1679: Niederhernsdorff
 since Niederhermsdorf

On 7 July 1921 merged the three villages together and formed the village Wurgwitz now, 53 years still remained independent until Wurgwitz in 1974 from Freital incorporated.

Residents

External links 
 German website of Wurgwitz

References 

Former municipalities in Saxony
Freital